Merry Go Round is the third studio album by the latin hip hop group Delinquent Habits. The song "House of the Rising Drum" was featured on the soundtrack of the video game Tony Hawk's Pro Skater 4.

Track listing

Personnel
Jack Gonzalez - featured artist, guest vocals (track 5)
Ivan S. Martin - main artist, vocals (all tracks)
Alejandro R. Martinez - main artist, producer, mixing, arranging
Michelle "Belle" Miralles- featured artist, guest vocals (tracks 4, 8, 15)
Pacheco - percussion (tracks 4, 7, 9, 15)
David L.K. Thomas - main artist, vocals (tracks 1-7, 9, 11-15)
Tokey - artwork

References

2000 albums
Delinquent Habits albums